Central College Kuliyapitiya (මධ්‍ය විද්‍යාලයය කුලියාපිටිය ) is a national school for boys and girls in Sri Lanka, in the suburb of Kuliyapitiya. The school was founded in 1947 by the Honorable Minister of Education C. W. W. Kannangara.

Early history
Following the central school concept of former Minister of Education C. W. W. Kannangara, under the patronage of the government, a bilingual mixed school was inaugurated in the Dandagamuwa electoral division on 3 February 1947. Central College Kuliyapitiya was the 54th and the last Central College. Mr. P. Senarath was appointed as the first principal of Central College Kuliyapitiya. The first session was attended by 149 students, 67 more the following day. There were 551 students on 17 February 1947. Under the patronage of the MP I. M. R. A. Iriyagolla, the father of the school, Central College was relocated to the new buildings at Meegahakotuwa on 7 July 1951, where Prime Minister D. S. Senanayeke declared the buildings open.

Prefect board 

Head Prefect (boy)  :-  G.E.Ovindu Vinduwara

Head Prefect (girl) :-  A.M.Dheeshana Dewanmini

Deputy Head Prefect (boy)  :-  R.P.Wihanga Tharusha

Deputy Head Prefect (girl) :-  H.P.Parami Niwandana

Teacher in Charge :-  Mr.Keerthi Gamunu Kumara

Houses
The students are divided among four houses.
                   Colour
 •Gemunu        -  Red 
 •Thissa        -  Green 
 •Rajasinghe    -  Yellow
 •Parackrama    -  Blue
The houses are named after the four main ancient kings of Sri Lanka. An annual track and field tournament among these houses is held at the beginning of the first term.

Old Students’ Association
Mr. Lional Lokuliyana, the then principal, conceived the idea of the Central College Old Students’ Association. In subsequent years the OSA and the School’s administration have co-operated in furthering the development of the college. The incumbent principal of the school has presided over the OSA. Other established associations include the Old Science Students’ Association and Old Cricketers’ Association.

1947 establishments in Ceylon
Educational institutions established in 1947
Schools in Kurunegala District